"One Night Only" is a song from the 1981 Broadway musical Dreamgirls, with lyrics written by Tom Eyen and music by Henry Krieger. In the context of the musical, "One Night Only" is performed twice in succession, as differing versions of the song — a soul ballad by the character Effie White and a dance version by her former bandmates Deena Jones & the Dreams — compete on the radio and the pop charts.

Song information
"One Night Only" was one of the first songs to be written for the play, which was originally titled after the tune during its workshop phase around 1978. Both versions of "One Night Only" appear as one track on the original 1982 Dreamgirls Broadway cast album, performed by Jennifer Holliday as Effie and Sheryl Lee Ralph, Loretta Devine, and Deborah Burrell as Deena Jones & the Dreams. "One Night Only" was later covered on album by Elaine Paige and Sylvester. Actor Hugh Jackman performed the song while hosting the 2004 Tony Awards ceremony, in a large production number featuring girl groups from the musicals Caroline, or Change, Hairspray, and Little Shop of Horrors.

Film versions

In 2006, Dreamgirls was adapted by writer and director Bill Condon into a motion picture for DreamWorks SKG and Paramount. For this version, the two versions of "One Night Only" were performed by Jennifer Hudson as Effie and Beyoncé Knowles, Anika Noni Rose, and Sharon Leal as Deena Jones and the Dreams. R&B production team The Underdogs served as the producers of "One Night Only" and the other songs from the film's score. A club remix of the latter version, produced by Eric Kupper and Richie Jones, was issued by Music World Entertainment and Columbia Records as a single from the Dreamgirls film soundtrack on August 15, 2006, four months before the release of the film. American rapper Lil Wayne later sampled Hudson's version for his song of the same name.

Formats and track listings
Digital download
 "One Night Only" (film version) – 3:23

House mixes EP
 "One Night Only" (Eric Kupper & Richie Jones Club Mix edit) – 4:06
 "One Night Only" (Eric Kupper & Richie Jones Club Mix) – 8:27
 "One Night Only" (Eric Kupper & Richie Jones Club Mix instrumental) – 8:27
 "One Night Only" (film version) – 3:23
 "One Night Only" (film version instrumental) – 3:24

Charts
The version of "One Night Only" performed by Deena Jones & the Dreams entered the UK Singles Chart at number 67 on September 6, 2009 due to strong digital download sales. An audition performance by 21-year-old Rozell Phillips on the reality TV show The X Factor renewed interest in the song, three years after it was initially released.

Cover versions
Sylvester, Disco and R&B singer featured his cover on the record Call Me 1983, Megatone Records Recorded at The Automatt San Francisco, CA.
Scherrie Payne, a member of The Supremes from 1973 to 1977, recorded a 12" single 6:35 duration, on the San Francisco label Megatone in 1984. It was a big hit in gay discos of the era, and featured fellow former Supreme Cindy Birdsong on background vocals.
Treyc Cohen performed the song when she was in the Bottom 2 on the 3rd Live Show of the seventh series of The X Factor.
Finnish rapper Mikael Gabriel used the samples of the song on track "Tuulee Tuulee" from his debut album 5 miljoonaa muuta.
The dance crew Breaksk8 danced to this song on America's Best Dance Crew as a part of their Broadway Challenge.
Korean pop quintet Wonder Girls performed a cover version of the song during their 1st Wonder Tour.
John Barrowman covered the song on his self-titled album John Barrowman.
Ailee, an American-born Korean pop singer, performed the song live on the music show Simply K-Pop in February 2012.
Rylan Clark performed the song when he was in the Bottom 2 on the 1st Live Show of the ninth series of The X Factor.
Faye Tozer of pop band Steps covered the song for the group's Ultimate Tour.
Arisxandra performed the song on the seventh series of Britain's Got Talent; this performance caused major controversy, as Libertino was eleven at the time and it was widely construed to be inappropriate for a minor to be singing it.
Shelley Smith performed the song when she was in the Bottom 2 on the 1st live show of the tenth series of The X Factor.
In 2014 Maltese child singer Veronica Rotin covered this on her debut album, Veronica Rotin.
In October 2017, the song was the first single released, by the group Leading Ladies, taken from the album Songs from the Stage.

References

1980s ballads
1982 songs
2006 singles
Beyoncé songs
Columbia Records singles
Disco songs
Geffen Records singles
Jennifer Hudson songs
Post-disco songs
Songs from Dreamgirls
Songs written by Henry Krieger
Songs with lyrics by Tom Eyen
Song recordings produced by David Foster
Soul ballads